Holland Township is the name of some places in the U.S. state of Michigan:

 Holland Township, Missaukee County, Michigan
 Holland Charter Township, Michigan in Ottawa County, Michigan

See also
Holland Township (disambiguation)

Michigan township disambiguation pages